There have been nine Formula One drivers from Finland who have taken part in races since the championship began in 1950. Three drivers have won the World Drivers' Championship, with Keke Rosberg being the first in 1982. Mika Häkkinen won it in 1998 and retained it in 1999, becoming the first - and so far only - Finnish double world champion. Kimi Räikkönen is the most recent Finnish champion having won the title in 2007.

World champions and race winners
To date nine Finnish drivers have taken part in a race weekend, with eight taking part in at least one race. Of those drivers three have won the World Drivers' Championship. The first Finnish champion was Keke Rosberg who won in 1982. Mika Häkkinen won the 1998 title and successfully defended it the following year. Kimi Räikkönen is the most recent Finnish world champion having won in 2007.

Heikki Kovalainen and Valtteri Bottas are also race winners. Kovalainen's single race win came at the 2008 Hungarian Grand Prix as a driver with McLaren.

Current drivers
Valtteri Bottas is a former GP3 champion. He joined Williams as a test driver in 2010 and remained in the role until the end of the 2012 season, making his race weekend debut at the first practice session for the 2012 Malaysian Grand Prix. On 28 November 2012, it was announced that Bottas would be promoted to a race drive for Williams in 2013, a position he retained for 2014 till 2016.

Former drivers
Leo Kinnunen was the first Finnish driver in Formula One. He entered six grand prix in 1974 but was only successful in his qualification for the Swedish Grand Prix, from which he retired eight laps in after an engine failure. Kinnunen was the last Formula One driver to race with an open helmet and goggles.

Mikko Kozarowitzky entered two races in 1977 but failed to qualify for either of them.

Keke Rosberg scored his maiden race win in 1982 and, combined with five podium finishes, he also won the Drivers' title. He is one of only two racers to win the championship in a season where he only scored one race victory, 

the other being Mike Hawthorn. The Autosport survey placed Rosberg in 25th in the top 40 greatest F1 drivers in history. His son and retired driver Nico Rosberg was born in Germany, has German and Finnish citizenship and raced under the German flag.

JJ Lehto was managed by Keke Rosberg and joined Formula One with Onyx in 1989. He only started two races in the first year and five in his second season, moving to Dallara for 1991. He achieved his career best result of third place but only finished five of the 16 races he started. He left the sport in 1994 and pursued other racing series.

Mika Häkkinen joined Lotus in 1991 and raced with the team for two seasons. The team was plagued by poor reliability and Häkkinen was only able to finish just over half of the races. He moved to McLaren, initially as a test driver and reserve for Ayrton Senna and Michael Andretti, and was later promoted to the driving seat when Andretti left. On his debut in Portugal, Häkkinen impressed by out-qualifying three-time world champion Senna and was given a permanent seat with the team. He raced with the team for the rest of his career, completing nine more seasons before retiring. However, his career could easily have been cut short at the end of the 1995 season when a crash in the practice sessions for Adelaide took him close to death. An emergency tracheotomy at the circuit saved his life before he was transferred to hospital. During the break between seasons he was able to make an excellent recovery, returning for the first race in 1996. It was not until the final race of the 1997 season that he would score a maiden victory, but that signalled the start of Häkkinen's most successful period in the sport. He became the world champion in 1998 and retained the title the following year. He came close to winning it for a third successive year, finishing second behind Michael Schumacher. After a slightly disappointing 2001 season, during which Häkkinen would visit the podium just three times, he retired from the sport. In the Autosport driver survey Häkkinen was placed as the 15th greatest F1 driver in history, higher than any of his compatriots.

Mika Salo joined the ailing Lotus team for the final two races of the 1994 season. He moved to Tyrrell for three seasons, each year scoring a highest race position of fifth. After spending 1998 with Arrows, Salo had a period where he raced as a stand-in for BAR and Ferrari. It was with Ferrari that Salo, racing instead of an injured Michael Schumacher, could have won the 1999 German Grand Prix had it not been for team orders forcing him to allow teammate Eddie Irvine through to take the victory. He regained a full-time drive in 2000 when he joined the Sauber team, but did not compete in the following year. He returned to lead the Toyota team in 2002 but was bought out of the second year of his contract, ending his Formula One career.

Kimi Räikkönen made his Formula One debut with Sauber before he secured a seat at McLaren, replacing compatriot Mika Häkkinen. His second season with the team was very successful and Räikkönen took ten podium finishes on the way to second place in the Drivers' Championship. After three further seasons with McLaren, during which he had mixed results, he moved to Ferrari, replacing Michael Schumacher. Räikkönen won the 2007 title, his first year with the team, but he only won three races over the following two years. Ferrari signed Fernando Alonso and released Räikkönen from his contract a year early. He spent two years in other racing categories before returning to Formula One with Lotus in 2012 before moving to Ferrari for the 2014 season, where he stayed until the end of the  season before moving to Alfa Romeo Racing on a two-year contract.  An Autosport survey taken by 217 Formula One drivers saw Räikkönen voted as the 22nd greatest F1 driver of all time. Räikkönen retired from Formula One at the end of 2021. He remains the last Ferrari and Finnish driver to win a championship.

Timeline

See also
List of Formula One Grand Prix winners

References